Jovo Mišeljić (Serbian Cyrillic: Јово Мишељић; born 15 October 1967) is a Bosnian former footballer.

Club career
After starting to play with his home city club FK Leotar still in the Yugoslav Second League, with the beginning of the war he moved to Serbia where he played a three solid seasons with FK Radnički Niš. In 1995, after a short spell in Spain with CD Badajoz, he moved to Cyprus to play with Aris Limassol where he will play three seasons and then transferring to Apollon FC (one of the biggest clubs in Cyprus. Afterwards he moved to Greece to play for one season with Athinaikos F.C. In 2000, he returned to Serbia and signed with FK Proleter Zrenjanin, but shortly after one season returned to Radnički Niš. He also played a half season as a loaned player with his first club, FK Leotar, before finishing in a lower league OFK Niš.

Personal life
He currently resides in Cyprus where he occasionally plays non-league football and coaching smaller categories teams and the youth teams of Aris Limassol.

External links
 Profile at Srbijafudbal
 

1967 births
Living people
People from Trebinje
Serbs of Bosnia and Herzegovina
Association football forwards
Yugoslav footballers
Bosnia and Herzegovina footballers
FK Leotar players
FK Radnički Niš players
CD Badajoz players
Aris Limassol FC players
Apollon Limassol FC players
Athinaikos F.C. players
FK Proleter Zrenjanin players
OFK Niš players
Yugoslav Second League players
First League of Serbia and Montenegro players
Segunda División players
Cypriot First Division players
Football League (Greece) players
Second League of Serbia and Montenegro players
Premier League of Bosnia and Herzegovina players
Bosnia and Herzegovina expatriate footballers
Expatriate footballers in Serbia and Montenegro
Bosnia and Herzegovina expatriate sportspeople in Serbia and Montenegro
Expatriate footballers in Spain
Bosnia and Herzegovina expatriate sportspeople in Spain
Expatriate footballers in Cyprus
Bosnia and Herzegovina expatriate sportspeople in Cyprus
Expatriate footballers in Greece
Bosnia and Herzegovina expatriate sportspeople in Greece